The following is a list of 2020 box office number-one films in Italy.

References

2020
Italy
2020 in Italian cinema